Maria De Filippi (born 5 December 1961) is an Italian television host and the owner of the television production company Fascino PGT. She is one of the most popular presenters.

Biography
De Filippi was born in Milan, Lombardy, but grew up in Pavia where her family moved when she was ten years old. Until his death in 2023, she was married to talk show host Maurizio Costanzo, with whom she had an adopted son.

Career
She has hosted numerous talk shows (mostly trashic) broadcast by Mediaset's Canale 5 such as Uomini e donne and C'e posta per te. From 1993 until the present day (2018), she has hosted on Canale 5 the talent show Amici (before was a simply talk show) which changed its name in 2002 to Amici di Maria De Filippi. Similar to the American series Fame, it features a school with two groups of aspiring young singers and dancers who compete against the other, performing live before an audience, and a panel of judges and instructors. Albanian-born dancer Kledi Kadiu was a regular performer on the programme.

In 2001 she hosted Telegatto with Gerry Scotti. Since 2009, she has been one of Italia's Got Talent's judges and producers.

Marco Carta, Valerio Scanu and Emma Marrone, three singers whose careers were launched through Amici, all subsequently went on to win first place in the prestigious Sanremo Music Festival in 2009, 2010, and 2012 respectively.

Among the TV-shows supported by Maria de Filippi and Fascino PGT's productions there are: Amici, Uomini e donne, C'è posta per te, Italia's Got Talent, Coca-Cola Summer Festival, Temptation Island, Tú sí que vales, Pequeños gigantes, Maurizio Costanzo Show, L'intervista, Selfie – Le cose cambiano, House Party e Ultima fermata.

Filmography

Television programs

Awards
1995 – Telegatto Intrattenimento con ospiti for Amici
1996 – Telegatto Intrattenimento con ospiti for Amici di sera
1997 – Telegatto Personaggio femminile dell'anno
1998 – Telegatto Intrattenimento con ospiti for Accadde domani
2000 – Telegatto Miglior talk show for C'è posta per te
2001 – Telegatto Miglior talk show for C'è posta per te
2002 – Telegatto Miglior reality show for Saranno famosi
2002 – Telegatto Trasmissione dell'anno for Saranno famosi
2003 – Telegatto Miglior reality show for Amici di Maria De Filippi
2003 – Telegatto Personaggio femminile dell'anno
2008 – Telegatto TeleRatto Speciale di Amianto for Amici di Maria De Filippi
2011 – Wind Music Award Premio Speciale "Arena di Verona"
2021 – Seat Music Award Premio Speciale

References

External links
 Official webpage
 Homepage of Amici TV show
 

1961 births
Italian television presenters
Italian women television presenters
Living people
Mass media people from Milan